The Lincolnton Historic District, in Lincolnton, Georgia, is a historic district which was listed on the National Register of Historic Places in 1993.  It included 126 contributing buildings, a contributing structure, a contributing site, and a contributing object.

Besides the contributing resources, it also includes 46 non-contributing buildings.

It includes:
the Lincoln County Courthouse, separately listed on the National Register, designed by G.L. Preacher
Lincolnton Presbyterian Church and Cemetery, separately listed.  This was once the "Union Church, was built in 1823 to serve as a meeting house for several different denominations, thus its name Union Church; such churches were a common phenomenon in early settlements but not many of these have survived. It is a simple gable front church with a cemetery that also dates back to the early 19th century."
Lamar-Blanchard House (1823), separately listed
Blanchard Hotel (1941)
a Sears, Roebuck and Company mail-order house, built in 1911 on Humphrey St.  This is model "Modern Home No. 124", a "one-story Georgian Cottage with a full-facade, integral porch supported by oversized Ionic columns and exaggerated brackets giving it an unusual Neoclassical/Craftsman style appearance".

It includes Bungalow/craftsman, Moderne, and Queen Anne architecture.

Gallery

References

GA
National Register of Historic Places in Lincoln County, Georgia
Historic districts on the National Register of Historic Places in Georgia (U.S. state)
Queen Anne architecture in Georgia (U.S. state)
Moderne architecture in the United States
Buildings and structures completed in 1796